Svandís Svavarsdóttir (born 24 August 1964 in Selfoss, Iceland) is a member of parliament of the Althing, the Icelandic parliament. She is a member of the Left-Green Movement.
She served as Minister for the Environment and Natural Resources in the government of Jóhanna Sigurðardóttir. In the First cabinet of Katrín Jakobsdóttir she served as Minister of Health. She was also the leader of the Left-Green Movement's parliamentary group. 
She is currently serving as the Minister of Fisheries and Agriculture.

External links
Althing biography (detailed Icelandic version)
Althing biography (short English version)

Living people
1964 births
People from Selfoss
Svandis Svavarsdottir
Svandis Svavarsdottir
Svandis Svavarsdottir
Svandis Svavarsdottir